This is a list of bands that play in the new wave style of traditional heavy metal. NWOTHM is a phenomenon in heavy metal, which is a revival of the heavy metal scene (including power, speed and partially doom metal).

List of bands
 Black Moor
 Bullet
 Cauldron
 Crystal Viper
 Diemonds
 Enforcer
 Haunt
 Hellripper
 Holy Grail
 Katana
 Kryptos
 Night Demon
 Redshark
 Seax
 Skull Fist
 Striker
 Spirit Adrift
 White Wizzard 
 Wytch Hazel

References

new wave of traditional heavy metal